The Head of the Chancellery (abbreviated ChefBK) is the highest ranking official of the German Chancellery and the principal assistant of the Chancellor of Germany. The Chief of Staff is in charge of the running of the German Chancellery as well as with coordinating the federal government's work. The Chief of Staff is either a member of the federal cabinet with the rank of Federal Minister for Special Affairs or holds the rank of Secretary of State. All Chiefs of Staff since 2005 have been members of the federal cabinet.

List of the heads of the Federal Chancellery

References

 
Government of Germany